The Republic of Poland Ambassador to Cyprus is the leader of the Poland delegation, Poland Mission to Cyprus.

As with all Poland Ambassadors, the ambassador to Cyprus is nominated by the President of Poland and confirmed by the Parliamentary Commission of the Foreign Affairs. The ambassador serves at the pleasure of the president, and enjoys full diplomatic immunity. On August 16, 1960, Cyprus gained its independence from the United Kingdom. Poland established diplomatic relations with Cyprus on January 15, 1961.

Poland does not recognize the Turkish Republic of Northern Cyprus, proclaimed November 15, 1983, by Turkey.

Poland Embassy in Cyprus is located in Nicosia.

List of ambassadors of Poland to Cyprus

Polish People's Republic 

 1961-1963: Zygmunt Dworakowski (envoy)
 1963-1966: Wiktor Mokoszko (chargé d’affaires)
 1966-1968: Henryk Golański
 1968-1971: Zygmunt Goć (chargé d’affaires)
 1971-1973: Tadeusz Wujek
 1973-1974: Wacław Zalewski (chargé d’affaires)
 1974-1978: Stanisław Goliszek (chargé d’affaires)
 1978-1982: Władysław Wieczorek (chargé d’affaires)
 1982-1984: Janusz Lewandowski
 1984-1988: Józef Tejchma
 1988-1989: Bolesław Fedorowicz (chargé d’affaires)

Third Polish Republic 

 1989-1992: Janusz Lewandowski
 1992-1993: Ryszard Żółtaniecki
 1993-1997: Janusz Jesionek (chargé d’affaires)
 1997-2000: Wojciech Lamentowicz
 2000-2003: Tomasz Lis
 2004-2008: Zbigniew Szymański
 2008-2014: Paweł Dobrowolski
 2014-2018: Barbara Tuge-Erecińska
 since 2018: Irena Lichnerowicz-Augustyn

References 

 
Cyprus
Poland